Countess Maria of Nassau (7 February 1556, Breda – 10 October 1616, Buren) was the second daughter of William the Silent by his first wife Anna of Egmond and Buren. She was named after William's first daughter, Maria, who had died in infancy.

Biography
At the start of the Eighty Years' War her older brother Philip William was removed to Spain where he was raised as a Catholic. Maria vigorously defended her brother's claims to the title Prince of Orange and the barony and city of Breda against the claims of their half-brother Maurice of Nassau.

It was her wish to marry Philip, Count of Hohenlohe, whom she had known since she was eleven. This plan met with initial resistance of her father (he gave his permission in 1582) and continued resistance from her brother Maurice. She was supposed to marry the (Catholic) son of the duke of Aerschot, to help acquire him as an important ally against the Spanish forces, but Maria refused to marry him as she had become a Calvinist. Also, Maria claimed guardianship of the possessions of Philip William while hostage in Spain, because of her being a full sister to Philip William, while Maurice was only his younger half-brother, and started a trial.

On 2 February 1595, at the age of 39, Maria finally married Philip of Hohenlohe in Buren, in the Dutch Reformed Church. The couple remained childless and Philip died in 1606. Her brother Philip William was released in 1595 and returned to Breda in 1610. In 1612, Maria founded a large orphanage in Buren.

She died in 1616 in Buren. She was entombed in the Saint Lambert Church there, which by then had become a Protestant Reformed Calvinist church.

Ancestors

External links
Portrait (in Dutch): Maria of Nassau

1556 births
1616 deaths
Maria of Nassau
16th-century Dutch people
17th-century Dutch women
Maria
Maria
People from Breda
Daughters of monarchs